JSC Star, formerly Perm Kalinin Component Production Association, is a company based in Perm, Russia. It is part of United Engine Corporation.

JSC Star produces aircraft engine fuel systems and other components for military and civilian aircraft.

References

External links
 Official website

Aircraft engine manufacturers of Russia
Companies based in Perm, Russia
United Engine Corporation
Ministry of the Aviation Industry (Soviet Union)
Aerospace companies of the Soviet Union